"Love Story" was episode #14 of the first season of the TV series M*A*S*H. It originally aired on January 7, 1973.

Radar has received a "Dear John" recording from his fiancée and he has consequently become depressed. This is until a new nurse arrives at the camp and it is love at first sight for him. However, Majors Burns and Houlihan want to break them up because their relationship is against regulations, forgetting that Radar's isn't the only romance against regulations. 

The episode is named after the film Love Story, which was released the same year as the film of MASH.

References

External links

M*A*S*H (season 1) episodes
1973 American television episodes